It Happened at the Police Station (Italian: Accadde al commissariato) is a 1954 Italian comedy film directed by Giorgio Simonelli and starring Nino Taranto, Alberto Sordi and Walter Chiari.

Cast
 Nino Taranto as Police Commissioner  
 Alberto Sordi as Alberto Tadini  
 Walter Chiari as Luigi Giovetti  
 Lucia Bosè as Stefania Rocca, wife of Luigi  
 Riccardo Billi as Riccardo, 1st tram driver  
 Mario Riva as 2nd tram driver  
 Carlo Dapporto as Antonio Badimenti  
 Lauretta Masiero as Silvana Moretti  
 Mara Berni as Arnalda Bazzini  
 Turi Pandolfini as Cannizzaro, the old man  
 Mario Abbate as Lucio Davila, the singer  
 Bruna Corrà as Street walker 
 Natale Cirino as Marshal Cannavò  
 Andreina Paul as The maid  
 Carlo Romano as Thief's victim  
 Anna Campori as The woman protesting against the strike  
 Alberto Sorrentino as Comic actor  
 Ignazio Balsamo as Taxi driver  
 Teresa Werlen as Enrichetta Biagioli  
 Pietro Carloni as Deputy Police Commissioner

References

Bibliography 
 Rémi Fournier Lanzoni. Comedy Italian style: the golden age of Italian film comedies. Continuum, 2008.

External links 
 

1954 comedy films
Italian comedy films
1954 films
1950s Italian-language films
Films directed by Giorgio Simonelli
Films with screenplays by Giovanni Grimaldi
Italian black-and-white films
1950s Italian films